Femi Branch (born May 14, 1970) is a Nigerian actor, director and producer.

Early life
Branch was born on May 14, 1970. His parents were teachers in Sagamu, Nigeria. He attended Satellite Town Primary School at Amuwo Odofin before attending the Airforce Secondary School at Ikeja. He later proceeded to Obafemi Awolowo University where, though admitted for Religious Studies, he later obtained a Bachelor of Arts degree in Dramatic Arts.

Career
Branch began his career at Obafemi Awolowo University in 1991, the same year he featured in a yoruba stage play titled Eniyan. He later featured in a movie titled Orisun (meaning: Origin) produced by members of staff of Obafemi Awolowo University but his first appearance on television was in 2003 in an MTN Group television commercial titled "Dance with me". He appeared in the role of Oscar in a soap opera titled Domino. He has since appeared in over a hundred Nigerian films, a few of which he produced and directed.

Awards and nominations

References

Living people
1970 births
Nigerian male film actors
Yoruba male actors
People from Ogun State
Obafemi Awolowo University alumni
20th-century Nigerian male actors
21st-century Nigerian male actors
Male actors in Yoruba cinema
Nigerian male television actors
Nigerian film directors
Nigerian film producers